The Chrysler PT Cruiser is a retro-styled compact car manufactured and marketed internationally by Chrysler in 5-door hatchback wagon (2001–2010) and 2-door convertible (2005–2008) body styles—over a single generation, with an intermediate facelift for model year 2006.

Evoking 1930s styling, the exterior of the PT Cruiser was designed by Bryan Nesbitt. Interior packaging was noted for its high-roof, high h-point seating, and flexible cargo and passenger configurations enabled by a multi-level rear cargo shelf and rear seats a user could fold, tumble, or remove.

By the end of production in July 2010, worldwide production had reached 1.35 million. Originally planned as a Plymouth model, The PT Cruiser was ultimately marketed as a Chrysler when Plymouth was discontinued. In its nameplate, PT stands for "Personal Transport" or "Personal Transportation". PT was the PT Cruiser's product code.

Overview 

The PT Cruiser is a front-wheel drive 5-passenger vehicle, classified as a truck in the US by the NHTSA for CAFE fuel economy calculations but as a car by most other metrics. Chrysler specifically designed the PT Cruiser to fit the NHTSA criteria for a light truck in order to bring the average fuel efficiency of the company's truck fleet into compliance with CAFE standards. A turbocharged GT model was introduced for the 2003 model year. 
A convertible was introduced for the 2005 model year.

Manufactured at Toluca Car Assembly in Toluca, Mexico. On March 8, 2006, DaimlerChrysler said it had built 1,000,000 PT Cruisers. The final PT Cruiser was built on July 9, 2010. A total of 1,050,281 PT Cruisers were marketed in the United States.

The PT Cruiser was also assembled at the Eurostar Automobilwerk in Graz, Austria, for markets outside North America, using the production code PG — for the model year 2002. European PT Cruisers built in 2001 or from 2003 on were manufactured in Mexico under the PT production code. The US version used a 2.4 L four-cylinder gasoline engine. In addition to this standard model, a 2.2 L four-cylinder diesel engine built by Mercedes-Benz was also available in Europe, Asia, and South Africa. A 2.0 L engine (D4RE) was also available outside the US.
In July 2000, the PT Cruiser replaced the Neon in Japan as their small car offering. Chrysler sold over 10,000 PT Cruisers in Japan. Both the five-door hatchback and the two-door convertible, and the GT turbo engine package were sold in Japan in right-hand drive configurations. Japanese versions were manufactured at the Austrian factory and were equipped very similarly to European specifications.

From 2002 until 2007, the PT Cruiser was used in the city of Urayasu, Chiba Prefecture by the Maihama Resort Cab company to serve as a taxi in the vicinity of Tokyo Disneyland because of its fun, retro appearance. The PT Cruiser taxis augmented the Maihama Resort Line service to Tokyo Disneyland. The ten Chrysler PT Cruisers were to help customers "hold on to that lingering Disney feeling all the way home." The cars were offered in Japan until April 2010, when it was replaced by the Dodge Caliber.

In 2001 Motor Trend named the PT Cruiser as its Car of the Year and  Car and Driver put it on its Ten Best list. the PT Cruiser also won the North American Car of the Year. The PT Cruiser also won the North American Car of the Year, based on a solid majority of top automotive journalists charged with "picking a vehicle that has set new standards or benchmarks in its class while considering aspects such as general design, safety, fuel economy, handling, general roadworthiness, performance, functionality, technical innovation, driver satisfaction and price." It also held the distinction of being listed by Consumer Guide automotive editors as "Best Buy" continuously from 2001 through 2006.

Design 
The PT Cruiser was part of the nostalgia wave that included models such as the Volkswagen New Beetle and the Mini Cooper. Rather than recalling previous namesake models, the PT Cruiser recalled 1930s and 1940s styling, influenced by the Chrysler Airflow.

The 2000 PT Cruiser grew out of a collaboration with Robert A. Lutz, who was an executive at Chrysler at the time, Dr. Clotaire Rapaille, and Bryan Nesbitt. Nesbitt later went on to design the Chevrolet HHR.

The PT Cruiser's design was loosely inspired by the Chrysler Pronto Cruizer concept car, while recalling the Chrysler and Desoto Airflow. Aspects of the PT Cruiser's rear styling also resembled the Chrysler CCV, a retro-styled compact vehicle recalling the Citroen 2CV, while its high roof evoked the Chevrolet Advance Design trucks.

On launch, the PT Cruiser was described as a market segment-buster. Chrysler's Dieter Zetsche described it as a continuing example of the automaker's innovation for new segments, demonstrating "you can have head-turning style, practicality, and value all in one package."

Car and Driver described the design as "highly distinctive, appeals to a broad segment of the public, and is characteristically American." The public's reaction to the PT Cruiser was polarized, but inspired a strong following among owners. Overall, car "was a valuable vehicle for many consumers."

Updates 

PT Cruiser models included the Classic edition, Limited edition, Touring edition, Couture edition (2010 only), "Dream Cruiser", "Street Cruiser", "Pacific Coast Highway" edition", and PT Cruiser GT. The non-GT Turbo edition models (introduced in 2004) were identified by a "2.4L Turbo" badge on the lower right-hand corner of the rear lift-gate. The GT model (introduced in 2003) has a "2.4L Turbo High Output" badge on the right-hand corner of the lift-gate indicating the 215–230 hp engine version.

Updates for 2006 included scalloped headlights, a revised grille no longer extending below the "bumper", a new lower front fascia that eliminated the patented brake cooling ducts, and redesigned taillights as well as available round fog lamps. The changes reduced the "retro vibe" that did not satisfy some customers as well as "exposing the main pitfall of retro design: How do you update old?"

Interior updates included a revised interior with an updated dash with an analog clock in the center stack. The audio system featured a line-in jack for MP3 players integrated into the dash. Features such as satellite radio, a premium sound system by Boston Acoustics with external amplifier and subwoofer, and UConnect hands-free Bluetooth for compatible cell phones also became available in 2006. The standard audio system now included an AM/FM stereo with single-disc CD player and a 3.5-millimeter auxiliary audio input jack with six speakers, replacing a cassette player and four speakers. A "Mopar" cruise control unit became available as an aftermarket unit on 2007 models. Also in 2007, Chrysler dealers were permitted to order vehicles with separate options (unbundled options from option packages) such as anti-lock brakes and Side Impact Airbags. Sirius Satellite Radio also became an option that could be installed as a dealer option with a factory appearance (i.e. roof mount satellite antenna).

Original plans called for the PT Cruiser to receive a complete redesign for 2007, but that was pushed back and little was changed as Chrysler was sorting out powertrains, styling, and even positioning as a luxury compact SUV. The convertible and the High Output engine were discontinued for the 2008 model year and sales dropped as information spread that Chrysler was going to discontinue the PT Cruiser in the near future.

For 2010, the last year of production, one trim level was offered, the PT Cruiser Classic. It included a 2.4 L I4 engine producing , standard four-speed automatic transmission with overdrive, AM/FM stereo with single-disc CD player, auxiliary audio input jack and six speakers, rear-mounted spoiler, air conditioning, cruise control, tire pressure monitoring system (TPMS), front and rear side SRS airbags, keyless entry with two remotes and panic alarm, ABS anti-lock brakes, and sixteen-inch alloy wheels. Optional features included leather seating surfaces, a power front driver's bucket seat, an engine block heater, a power tilt-and-sliding sunroof, and heated dual front bucket seats. Exterior color options were Bright Silver Metallic, Brilliant Black Crystal Pearl Coat, Deep Water Blue Pearl Coat, Inferno Red Crystal Tinted Pearl Coat, Silver Steel Metallic, and Stone White Clear Coat. The only interior color option was Pastel Slate Gray.

Safety 
In 2002, Euro NCAP gave the PT Cruiser a three (out of five) stars rating. The car received bad results in the frontal impact test (6 out of 16 possible points). The height of the seats and side airbags helped to attain a maximum score of 16 points in the side impact test. The low frontal scores are in part explained by the cushioning near the knees, designed to protect unbelted occupants, which is not a factor in the EU where passengers must wear seat belts.

For 2008, the Insurance Institute for Highway Safety gave the PT Cruiser the highest rating of Good overall for occupant protection in frontal crashes and the lowest overall rating of Poor for side crashes. It was the only small car to not offer electronic stability control.

Trim levels 
Four-door hatchback
 Base- Included 5-speed manual transmission, AM/FM stereo with a cassette player (or single-disc CD player and auxiliary audio input jack for 2006–2009 models) and 6 premium speakers, manual roll-up windows (later standard power windows), and manual door locks (later standard power door locks), fifteen-inch steel wheels with wheel covers, cloth seating surfaces, and folding rear seat.
 Touring- Added AM/FM stereo with single-disc CD player, power windows and door locks, and keyless entry to Base.
 Touring Signature Series- Added Boston Acoustics premium speakers with an external amplifier, alloy wheels, and exterior color-keyed details to Touring. Special W.P. Chrysler Signature Series emblems on front fenders.
 Limited- Added AM/FM stereo with cassette and CD players (later six-disc CD/MP3 changer) and Infinity (later Boston Acoustics) premium speakers with an external amplifier, chromed alloy wheels, and leather-and-suede-trimmed seating surfaces with heated front seats to Touring.
 Street Cruiser- Added body kit, special alloy wheels, and color-keyed exterior details.
 GT- Added high-performance 2.4L Turbocharged Inline Four-Cylinder (I4) engine, special alloy wheels, and body kit to Limited. GT Cruiser emblem on tailgate.
 Walter P. Chrysler Signature Series – 2005, 2006, 2007, and 2008
 Limited edition Platinum Series – 2004 only
 Dream Cruiser Series – 2002–2005, 2009 only- Added two-tone paint scheme and special alloy wheels.
 Sport – see below
 Classic – 2010 only- Same features as Touring trim level with alloy wheels.
 Couture – 2010 only- Added single exterior color option and two-toned leather-trimmed interior to Classic.

Two-door convertible (same features as 5-door hatchback models with power-retractable cloth convertible top)

PT Cruiser GT 
The PT Cruiser GT (also known as the GT Cruiser) is a high output turbocharged hot hatch variant of the PT Cruiser introduced as a 2003 model. The engine was upgraded over the standard PT. This included stronger crankcase webbing, a thicker deck with 11 mm head bolts (vs 10 mm), an oil drain back for the turbo, a cast aluminum structural oil pan, a higher capacity oil pump, a crankshaft of higher hardness steel, improved machining of bearing journals, oil squirters (to cool underside of pistons), eutectic aluminum alloy pistons made specially by Mahle, and forged connecting rods with cracked caps and 9 mm bolts. The cylinder head was also different for turbo engines, from naturally aspirated. The turbo version was used by both the PT Cruiser GT and Dodge Neon SRT-4 with larger diameter valves and seats, exhaust valves made of Inconel, improved cooling as well as larger oil drain back passages, and different camshafts. The PT Cruiser Turbo engine package differs from the SRT-4 because the intake manifold, turbocharger plumbing, and intercooler are different. Upgrades such as MOPAR Stage 1 and supporting turbo components were available from the manufacturer. Many of the performance parts from the SRT-4 are compatible with the PT Cruiser GT.

 Performance
  @ 5000 rpm and  @ 3600 rpm (2003–2005)
  @ 5100 rpm and  @ 2400 rpm (2006–2007)
 Top speed  (Governor limited)

 Standard features
 Autostick or 5-speed Getrag manual transmission
 4-wheel disc brakes with ABS and traction control
 Larger disc-brake rotors and Turbo calipers
 Chromed 17-inch wheels with P205/50R17 tires
 Body-color monotone front fascia with larger, lower openings
 Body-color monotone rear fascia with larger exhaust opening
 Specially tuned suspension (which also dropped the height 1 inch)
 Performance-tuned exhaust system with a large diameter chrome exhaust tip

Factory special editions

Flame package & Woodie package 
Factory Flame package – Flame-inspired vinyl decals of a 'tone-on-tone' type applied on the hood, front fenders, and front doors starting with 2002 models. Four flame designs: fading orange-to-red on cars painted red, fading blue to cranberry flames on cranberry finished cars, a dark silver that fades into bright silver on bright silver paint, and fading deep magenta to black flames highlighted with a blue border on black cars.

Woodie package – Available on all Chrysler PT Cruiser models from 2002 to 2004 models, the simulated wood panels were on the sides of the vehicle and on the rear hatch. The vinyl graphic featured a linear Medium Oak woodgrain framed with Light Ash surround moldings. Chrysler described the designers were inspired by the automaker's wood-body heritage from the early Town & Country models.

Street Cruiser Route 66 edition 
Available in 2006 was a Route 66 edition in either Solar Yellow or Black. This version featured Solar Yellow brake calipers, body-color grille, solar-tinted sunscreen glass, liftgate mounted spoiler, 17-inch all-season performance tires, four-wheel anti-lock brakes with low-speed traction control, speed control, and a sport suspension. Exterior identification included a 'Street Cruiser' badge with Solar Yellow accents on the liftgate and 'Route 66' badges on the front doors.

A total of 1,443 Route 66 models were produced in North America, with 142 of those equipped with 5-speed manual transmissions.

Street Cruiser Pacific Coast Highway edition 
Announced during the 2006 Woodward Dream Cruise and named for one of the most picturesque driving routes (officially called California State Route 1) in the United States.
Based on the 2007 Chrysler PT Cruiser Touring model, this version featured a Pacific Blue Pearl body, 4-wheel disc anti-lock brakes, bright front door sill scuff pads, front bright accent ring cupholders, silver shift knob, chrome lock knobs, chrome bodyside molding, "Street Cruiser" badge, Pacific Coast Highway edition badge, rear body-color spoiler, bright exhaust tip, leather steering wheel with bright spokes, sport suspension, supplemental side airbags, 6-way power driver's seat, Sirius satellite radio, 17x6 inch aluminum platinum clad wheels with 205/50R17XL 93H BSW all-season performance tires, and cloth seats with blue insert.

Street Cruiser Sunset Boulevard edition 
A version of the 2008 PT Cruiser LX was named for a road (Sunset Boulevard in Los Angeles, California) that has been described as an influence for many movies, songs, and TV shows. Street Cruiser Sunset Boulevard edition version was based on the 2008 PT Cruiser LX and was limited to 500 units. It included "Sunset Crystal" paint accented with various chrome body-trim pieces, deep-tint glass, 16-inch chrome wheels with all-season touring tires.

Dream Cruiser Series 5 

The Dream Cruiser Series 5 production totaled 1,750 units for the US market during the 2009 model year. It included 4-speed automatic transmission, pearl-white body (however one was made in inferno red and one finished in bright silver) with a black roof and spoiler, gray interior with leather and chrome trim, upper- and lower-billet aluminum cross-hatch pattern grilles, chromed door handles and body-side moldings, chromed stainless-steel exhaust tip (on turbo),  SRT Design wheels with all-season performance tires, unique 'PT' door badging, PT Dream Cruiser Series 5 tailgate badge, fog lamps, and a Brilliant Black Crystal Pearl hoop spoiler.

The vehicle was announced in conjunction with the 2008 Woodward Dream Cruise.

PT Cruiser Sport 
Based on the Classic trim, the Sport version included a roof-mounted body-colored spoiler, 16-inch alloy wheels, PT Cruiser Sport badge, and an exclusive graphite metallic paint.

The PT Cruiser Sport was available with a two-liter gasoline engine in the UK market.

Couture edition 

The Couture edition was exhibited at the 2010 Geneva Motor Show as part of the expansion to the European market It featured a contrasting two-tone paint scheme: black above the beltline and silver metallic on the bottom section, with a red pinstripe dividing the two. The interior included Radar Red leather buckets (dark gray leather optional) with black piping, a red or black shifter knob, and chrome appliques. Outside features included 16-inch chrome-clad wheels with chromed bodyside moldings and accents. Production was limited to 500.

Chrysler Panel Cruiser
The Chrysler Panel Cruiser was a design study that appeared at the 2000 Detroit Auto Show. Based on the PT Cruiser, it featured panels in place of the rear doors and a wooden floor in place of the rear seats. The Panel Cruiser was designed to mix elements of classic American panel trucks with those of a sports sedan. It rolled on 17-inch chrome wheels with 215/45 tires. The rear interior space featured a full wood floor with bright skid strips and wood bars along with the side quarter panels with cargo straps providing a multi-use cargo area.

Notes

References

External links 

 Chrysler.com – 2001 PT Cruiser homepage, through Internet Archive
 
 Official Chrysler UK Press Release
 
 Chrysler Japan website (in Japanese)

PT Cruiser
Front-wheel-drive vehicles
Compact sport utility vehicles
Crossover sport utility vehicles
Convertibles
Hot hatches
Cars introduced in 2000
Cars discontinued in 2010
2010s cars
Retro-style automobiles
Light trucks
Euro NCAP small MPVs